Truro station was a train station located in Truro, Massachusetts at the west end of Depot Road.

History

The station was located on a peninsula in Pamet Harbor, with embankments and bridges crossing inlets both north and south of the station. Tracks on both sides were washed out in the "Christmas Blizzard" of 1909, interrupting rail service to Provincetown for days.

The station was razed when the tracks between Eastham and Provincetown were removed during the early 1960s.

References

External links

 
Old Colony Railroad Stations on Cape Cod
Stations along Old Colony Railroad lines
Demolished buildings and structures in Massachusetts
Former railway stations in Massachusetts